In basketball, a field goal is a basket scored from an action on the playing court except free throws. The National Basketball Association's (NBA) field goal percentage leader is the player with the highest field goal percentage in a given season. To qualify as a field goal percentage leader, the player must have attempted at least 300 field goals. Aside from the lockout shortened 1998–99 and 2011–12 seasons, as well as the pandemic shortened 2019–20 and 2020–21 seasons, this has been the entry criteria since the 1974–75 season.

Key

Annual leaders

Notes

References
General

Specific

National Basketball Association lists
National Basketball Association statistical leaders